Olga Nikolayevna Amelchenkova (born on 5 September 1990 in Borisoglebsk, Voronezh Oblast) is a Russian political figure, deputy of the 8th State Duma convocation. After graduating from the Saint Petersburg State University of Engineering and Economics in 2012, she was hired on a competitive basis to the administration of the Leningrad Oblast where she specialized on youth policies. In 2015 she co-founded the All-Russian Volunteers of Victory movement. In January 2022, she suggested recognizing the Siege of Leningrad as an act of genocide. 

In 2017 Amelchenkova became a member of the Civic Chamber of the Russian Federation. In 2018, Central Election Commission registered her as a trustee of the presidential candidate Vladimir Putin. 

In September 2021, she was elected to the State Duma of the 8th convocation, running from the United Russia. She represents the Leningrad Oblast and Pskov Oblast constituencies.

On 24 March 2022, the United States Treasury sanctioned her as a member of the State Duma in response to the 2022 Russian invasion of Ukraine.

References

1990 births
Living people
People from Borisoglebsk
United Russia politicians
21st-century Russian politicians
Eighth convocation members of the State Duma (Russian Federation)
Russian individuals subject to the U.S. Department of the Treasury sanctions